"Una Canción Me Trajo Hasta Aquí" ("A Song Brought Me Here") is a song written and performed by Uruguayan recording artist Jorge Drexler. It was released in February 2010 by Warner Music as the first single from his album Amar la Trama. The track was produced by Matías Cella and co-produced by Drexler and Carles Campi Campón. The album was recorded in four days, (November 1–4, 2009) at Cata Studios in Madrid, Spain, a television studio, in front of a small audience who were selected in an online contest. The reason to record the album under this format was to avoid the "coldness" of the recording studio. Drexler performed lead vocals, played guitar, and was joined by a band composed of additional guitarists, a rhythm section, a horn section, backup vocalists and auxiliary musicians.

The song received positive reviews. Jason Birchmeier of Allmusic on his review of Amar la Trama named it a "standout worthy of special mention." On her review for Billboard magazine, Judy Cantor-Navas noted that the lyrics were "poetic", addressing familiar themes for the singer: fated encounters, global wanderings, the South-American experience and the universal wonder of everyday moments. Even though the song was not promoted to radio in the United States, it received two nominations at the 11th Latin Grammy Awards, Record of the Year and Song of the Year, which were awarded to Mexican band Camila for the song "Mientes". While reviewing the nominees for Song of the Year, Leila Cobo, also from Billboard magazine, proclaimed the track as "lilting" and "almost innocent" that is appealing in its simplicity and arrangement.

Personnel
 Jorge Drexler – main performer, co-producer, vocals, lyricist, guitar
 Matías Cella – producer, vocals
 Carles Campi Campón – co-producer, autoharp, glockenspiel, omnichord, guitar, vocals
 Roc Albero – flugelhorn
 Borja Barrueta – lap steel guitar, drums, vocals
 Josemi Carmona – Spanish guitar
 Ben Sidran – organ, vocals
Source:

References

2010 songs
Jorge Drexler songs
Spanish-language songs
Songs written by Jorge Drexler
Warner Music Group singles